A superclub is a very large or superior nightclub, often with several rooms with different themes. The term was first coined in Mixmag, the British electronic dance and clubbing magazine, in 1995, referring to the new wave of clubs such as Ministry of Sound and Cream, which were dominating the English club scene.

Superclubs may include nightclubs that have high capacity, or are multi-story, high profile, and operate city and region wide or are well known. Some superclubs are owned and managed by a dance music record label or a club that was or is culturally important. The term may also be used to define its position within the club scene hierarchy.

Forerunners of contemporary superclubs already existed in the early 20th century. The Guardian describes the Moka Efti in Berlin, a major dancing establishment of the Golden Twenties, as a "1920s superclub".

Privilege Ibiza is the "world's largest nightclub" according to the Guinness Book of Records, with a capacity of 10,000 people.

History
Notes: The list of clubs below indicate the dates they were first established.

1960s
Early examples of "superclubs" include Annabel's (London, 1963), Blow Up (Munich, 1967) and Pacha (Sitges, 1967).

1970s
Examples of "superclubs" from this period include Pacha, Ibiza in (1973) or Amnesia, Ibiza, (1976), Studio 54, New York City, (1977), Paradise Garage, New York, (1977), Ku Club Ibiza, (1978), Xenon, New York, (1978), Roxy NYC, New York, (1978), Dorian Gray, Frankfurt, (1978), Heaven London, (1979), Danceteria, New York, (1979)

1980s
Examples of "superclubs" from this period include The Saint in New York in (1980), The Fridge, London, (1981), The Haçienda in Manchester opened in (1982), The Limelight, New York, (1983), Hippodrome, London, (1983), Space, Ibiza, (1986), Tunnel, New York, (1986), Palladium, New York, (1985), Quadrant Park, Liverpool, (1988), Excalibur Nightclub, Chicago, (1989), The Sound Factory, New York, (1989).

1990s
Examples of "superclubs" from this period include Trade and Turnmills, London, (1990), Ministry Of Sound in London (1991), Juliana's Tokyo, (1991), Zouk, Singapore, (1991), Renaissance (1992), Avalon, Boston (1992), Bunker, Berlin, (1992), E-Werk, Berlin, (1993), G-A-Y, London, (1993),  Cream at Nation, Liverpool, (1993),  Miss Moneypenny's, Birmingham, (1993), Ultraschall, Munich, (1994), Twilo, New York, (1995), The End, London, (1995), Nation, Washington D.C., (1995), The Emporium. Coalville, (1995), Privilege, Ibiza, (1995), Gatecrasher One, (1996), Godskitchen, (1996), KW – Das Heizkraftwerk, Munich, (1996), The Church, Denver (1996), Fabric, London (1999), DC10, Ibiza, (1999), 
Home, London, (1999)

2000s
Examples of "superclubs" from this period include Womb, Tokyo, (2000), Bungalow 8, New York City, (2001), Hakkasan, Las Vegas, (2001), Vision Club, Chicago, (2002),  Vanguard LA, Hollywood, (2002), SeOne, London, (2002), Berghain, Berlin, (2003), Cielo, New York, (2003), Opium Garden Miami, (2003), AIR, Birmingham, (2003), Crobar, Chelsea, New York, (2003), Sound Bar, Chicago, (2004), Myth,  Minneapolis, (2005), TAO, Las Vegas, (2005), 1015 Folsom Nightclub, San Francisco, (2005), Belo, (San Diego), (2006), XS Nightclub, Las Vegas, (2008), Marquee Nightclub and Dayclub, Las Vegas, (2010), Omnia, Las Vegas (2015) (formerly, Pure, (2004)), Marquee Nightclub, Singapore, (2018), KAOS Dayclub and Nightclub, Las Vegas, (2019).

2010s
Examples of "superclubs" from this period include: Echostage, Washington D.C., (2012), Output, New York City, (2013), White Dubai @ Meydan, (2013), MMA Club, Munich (2014), Bassiani, Tbilisi, (2014), Laroc, Sao Paulo, (2015), Printworks, London (2017), Kompass klub, Ghent.

Culturally important clubs
The clubs listed here do not necessarily meet the criteria for the spatial definition of a "superclub" but are included for their significant cultural importance: Peppermint Lounge, (1958), New York City, UFO Club, London (1960's), The Loft, New York City, (1970), The Warehouse, Chicago, (1977), Mudd Club, New York, (1978), Billy's, London (1978), Blitz Club, London, (1979), Pyramid Club, New York, (1979), Club 57, New York, (1979), Camden Palace, London, (1982), The Batcave, London (1982), Taboo, London, (1985), The World, New York, (1986), Kinky Gerlinky, London, (1989), Tresor, Berlin, (1991), Trade (1990-2008), Vague Club, Leeds, (1993), B 018, Beirut, (1994).

Superclub the album
Cream, Gatecrasher and Pacha teamed up in 2010 to produce the album Superclub.  Released on 22 November in the UK, the 3 CD collection has one disc for each of the clubs and was the first release from Rhino UK's dance imprint One More Tune. A second album, called Superclub Ibiza, was released in July 2011 by EMI.

See also
 Nightclub
 List of electronic dance music venues

References

Sources
 Bibby, Michael; Goodlad, Lauren M. E. (21 March 2007). Goth: Undead Subculture. Duke University Press. .
 Cohen, edited by Philip; Rustin, Michael J. (2008). London's turning : Thames Gateway-prospects and legacy. Aldershot, Hampshire, England: Ashgate. .
 Gerstner, David A., (2012), Routledge International Encyclopedia of Queer Culture. Routledge, .
 Hsalam, Dave, (2015), Life After Dark: A History of British Nightclubs & Music Venues, Simon and Schuster, .
 Lau, Stella Sai-Chun (2012). Popular Music in Evangelical Youth Culture. Cambridge, England,: Routledge. p. 174. .
 Niemitz, Brian (2006). Night+Day New York. ASDavis Media Group. .
 O'Reilly, Daragh; Kerrigan, Finola (27 April 2010). Marketing the Arts: A Fresh Approach. Routledge. .
 Richardson, Diane; Seidman, Steven (18 November 2002). Handbook of Lesbian and Gay Studies. SAGE. .
 Robinson, Roxy, (2016), Music Festivals and the Politics of Participation, Routledge. .

Electronic dance music venues